The Gardener (also known as Garden of Death and Seeds of Evil) is a 1974 American horror film written and directed  by James H. Kay and starring Joe Dallesandro and Katharine Houghton.

Plot
A bored little rich girl is bewitched by a very weird gardener...

Cast 
 Joe Dallesandro as Carl, The Gardener
 Katharine Houghton as Ellen Bennett
 Rita Gam as Helena Boardman
 James Congdon as John Bennett
 Anne Meacham as Mrs. García
 Teodorina Bello as Liza, The Maid
 Ivan Rodriguez as Max
 Esther Mari as Rosa
 Irma Torres as Domenica

Release

Home media
The film was released on DVD by Subversive on February 28, 2006. It was later released by Subversive Cinema on January 29, 2008 as a part of its two-disk "Greenhouse Gore Two-Fer".

Reception

TV Guide gave the film a negative review, calling it "rotten". Reviewing Subversive's DVD release of the film, Johnny Butane from Dread Central awarded the film a score of 3.5 out of 5. While noting that the film was "dull and unexciting", Butane stated that the DVD's extras made it worth buying. Brett Gallman from Oh, the Horror! panned the film, criticizing the lack of atmosphere, threadbare plot, sluggish pacing, and dull photography.
Glenn Erickson  from DVD Talk criticized the film's lack of scares or tension, and script, calling it "yet another ill-fated attempt to try something different in a horror movie".

See also
 List of American films of 1974

References

External links 
 
 
 
 

1974 films
1974 horror films
American horror films
Films shot in Puerto Rico
1970s English-language films
1970s American films
English-language horror films